Patrick Kerrigan (28 January 1928 – 3 September 2022) was an Irish Gaelic football player and trainer. At club level he played with Rhode and was also a member of the Offaly senior football team. Kerrigan later served as trainer with Rhode and Walsh Island.

Career

Kerrigan first played Gaelic football at juvenile and underage levels with the Rhode club. He eventually progressed onto the  club's senior team and won Offaly SFC titles in 1948, 1955 and 1958. At inter-county level, Kerrigan made one appearance for Offaly in a Leinster SFC defeat by Wexford in 1953.

Kerrigan's coaching career began at club level when he took charge of Rhode in 1960. He guided the club to four Offaly SFC titles between 1966 and 1975. Kerrigan subsequently coached the Walsh Island team to a record-breaking six successive Offaly SFC titles, as well as consecutive Leinster Club Championships.

Death
Kerrigan died at the Midland Regional Hospital in Tullamore on 3 September 2022, at the age of 94.

Honours

Player

Rhode
Offaly Senior Football Championship: 1948, 1955, 1958

Coach

Rhode
Offaly Senior Football Championship: 1966, 1967, 1969, 1975
Offaly Under-21 Football Championship: 1966, 1975

Walsh Island
Leinster Senior Club Football Championship: 1978, 1979
Offaly Senior Football Championship: 1978, 1979, 1980, 1981, 1982, 1983

References

External link

 Paddy Kerrigan player profile

1928 births
2022 deaths
Rhode Gaelic footballers
Offaly inter-county Gaelic footballers
Gaelic football coaches